Galliford Try plc is a British construction company based in Leicester, England. It was created through a merger in 2000 of two businesses: Try Group, founded in 1908 in London, and Galliford, founded in 1916. 

Formerly involved in house-building, it sold its housing businesses to Bovis Homes - subsequently renamed Vistry Group - in January 2020, and Galliford Try is today focused on the building, highways and environment markets. Prior to the sale of its housing arm, it was ranked fifth largest by turnover among UK construction companies in 2019.

History
The company was created in 2000 through a merger of Try Group plc, founded in 1908 in London, and Galliford plc, founded in 1916.

Try Group
Try was founded by William S Try, a carpenter, in 1908 in Uxbridge, west London. W. S. Try Ltd operated as a general contractor until the beginning of the 1970s, when Try Homes was formed. Despite acquisitions, housing remained on a relatively small scale, peaking at around 200 units a year in the early 1990s.

Galliford
Thomas Galliford established a steamroller hire business in Wolvey, Warwickshire in 1916, but this closed during World War II after which his sons re-formed the company, incorporated as a civil engineering business, Galliford & Sons, on 2 April 1952. Galliford became a public company in 1965. It entered the private housing market in 1973 with the acquisition of Crabb Curtis. The housing contribution was subsequently extended through Stamford Homes and, in 1998, the acquisition of Midas Homes, by which time the group was building around 500 houses a year.

Galliford Try plc
Between 2005 and 2015, the company was led by chief executive Greg Fitzgerald. The company expanded its construction business by acquiring Morrison Construction from AWG plc in 2006 and Miller Construction from Miller Homes in 2014. It expanded its housebuilding business by acquiring Gerald Wood Homes in 2001, Chartdale in 2006, Kendall Cross in 2007, Linden Homes in 2008,  Rosemullion Homes in 2009 and Shepherd Homes in 2015. All the individual house building divisions were rebranded as Linden Homes in 2011.

In 2012, Galliford Try was appointed by Estura on a construction project at the Salcombe Harbour Hotel in Devon, in which the customer failed to submit a payment notice on time in accordance with the Housing Grants, Construction and Regeneration Act 1996, leading to the court case of Galliford Try Building Ltd v Estura Ltd., one of the leading cases on construction payment law in the UK.

In February 2018, following the collapse the previous month of Carillion (Galliford Try's joint venture partner, with Balfour Beatty, on the Aberdeen Western Peripheral Route, AWPR), Galliford Try said it would need to raise £150m to pay for cost overruns on the project; in November 2018, the company said delays would cost an extra £20m, taking its total project hit to £143m. CEO Peter Truscott said the company's construction division would no longer undertake fixed price major projects of this kind. On 27 March 2018, the company confirmed it had successfully raised £158m in a rights issue. Truscott left Galliford Try in March 2019 with Graham Prothero appointed as new CEO.

In April 2019, the company announced it would reduce its construction operation as part of a strategic review undertaken in light of additional costs from the AWPR project, and from Morrison Construction's role on the £1.35bn Queensferry Crossing project. The announcement caused Galliford Try's share price to drop 19%. The company subsequently announced 350 jobs were likely to be cut – mostly in Galliford Try's Scottish infrastructure operations – as the company focused on core strengths in buildings, water and highways. Restructuring the construction business cost the group £10m.

In July 2019, Galliford Try was suspended from the Prompt Payment Code for failing to pay suppliers on time. Following improvements in its payment performance, it was restored to the Prompt Payment Code in January 2020.

On 11 September 2019, the group reported revenues for the year to June 2019 of £2.863bn (down 8% from 2018); pre-tax profit was down 27% at £104.7m. Galliford Try reported a £61.5m operating loss on its construction activities, with revenues down 18%, affected also by the losses incurred on the AWPR project.

2019-2020: Sale of house-building arm
On 24 May 2019, Galliford Try's board rejected a £950m offer from Bovis Homes (led by former CEO Fitzgerald) for the Linden Homes and Partnerships and Regeneration businesses. In July, the group was said to be considering a possible demerger of construction from the more profitable housing and partnerships business, potentially in 2020/21.

Talks with Bovis Homes about a possible sale reopened in September 2019, with a preliminary deal, valued at £1.075bn, reportedly agreed. Sale of the housing business would recapitalise Galliford Try's construction business, which, following restructuring, would employ some 3,400 staff generating revenues of around £1.4bn. On 7 November, it was reported that Bovis Homes had agreed a share and cash deal that valued Galliford Try's housing business at £1.1bn. The sale of Galliford Try's housing interests to Bovis Homes – later renamed Vistry Group – was completed on 3 January 2020. Galliford Try received shares plus £300m cash in the deal, making it a well-capitalised standalone contractor. As expected, Bill Hocking, formerly head of Galliford Try's construction arm, was appointed CEO of Galliford Try Holdings. Sale of the housing arm left the remaining business able to focus on the general construction, highways and environment markets.

2020-present: Stand-alone contractor
During the COVID-19 pandemic in 2020, Galliford Try furloughed staff and suspended a previously announced dividend. It said it could not quantify the pandemic's impacts on its operations and supply chain, and on its financial performance. In a July 2020 trading update, Galliford Try reported an operating loss of 5% due to the pandemic. In a March 2021 trading update, Hocking forecast Galliford Try would report a full-year profit of around £10m on revenues between £1.1bn and £1.3bn.

In October 2021, Galliford Try acquired NMCN's water business for £1m from NMCN's administrators. In December 2021, the company moved its headquarters from Wolvey to the Gateway House development at Grove Park in Leicester.

Major contracts

Major projects include:
the Centre Court roof at Wimbledon, completed in 2009
the Corby Cube, completed in 2010
 the Warwickshire Justice Centre in Leamington Spa, completed in 2010
the restoration of the St. Pancras Renaissance London Hotel, completed in 2011
the Museum of Liverpool, completed in 2011
The Hive, Worcester, completed in 2012
Halley VI Research Station, completed in 2013
Hotel Football overlooking the football ground Old Trafford, completed in 2014
Birmingham Dental Hospital, completed in 2016
Queensferry Crossing, completed in 2017
Aberdeen Western Peripheral Route, completed in 2019

References

External links
Official site

Construction and civil engineering companies established in 1908
Construction companies based in London
1908 establishments in England
Companies listed on the London Stock Exchange
British companies established in 1908